August B. "Cap" Coleman was an American tattoo artist. In 1918, he opened a tattoo parlor in Norfolk, Virginia near the navy base there, with sailors as his main clientele. When Norfolk's City Council ruled tattooing illegal in June 1950 by passing Ordinance No. 15,668 Coleman, along with many other tattooists were forced out of the city. Many of the Norfolk tattooists, including Coleman, moved across the Elizabeth River to Portsmouth, Virginia and went to work with Tex Peace. Franklin Paul Rogers learned from him. He designed many of the tattoo flashes used by other tattooists. He is buried at Forest Lawn Cemetery in Norfolk, Virginia.

References

1884 births
1973 deaths
American tattoo artists